William Maynard, 2nd Baron Maynard (c. 1623 – 3 February 1688/89) was an English aristocrat, the son of William Maynard, 1st Baron Maynard and Anne Everard. He married Dorothy Banastre. He later married Lady Margaret Murray, daughter of William Murray, 1st Earl of Dysart and Catherine Bruce. He was Comptroller of the Household from 1672 to 1687 and Custos Rotulorum of Essex from 1673 to 1688.

By Margaret he had one daughter, Elizabeth. She married Sir Thomas Brograve, 3rd Baronet, son of Sir Thomas Brograve, 1st Baronet and Grace Hewet (daughter of Sir John Hewet, 1st Baronet), on 26 January 1691–92 at the Chapel Royal in Whitehall, London.

References

 

 

1620s births
1689 deaths
2
English MPs 1640 (April)
Barons in the Peerage of Ireland